John Emil Österholm (5 October 1882 Ekenäs – 16 November 1960 Helsinki) was a Finnish politician and journalist. He was a member of the Parliament of Finland for the Swedish People's Party of Finland in 1919–1960. After the World War II, Österholm was member of the Finnish delegation at the Paris Peace Treaties.

References 

1882 births
1960 deaths
Swedish-speaking Finns
Finnish journalists
Swedish People's Party of Finland politicians
Members of the Parliament of Finland (1919–22)
Members of the Parliament of Finland (1922–24)
Members of the Parliament of Finland (1924–27)
Members of the Parliament of Finland (1927–29)
Members of the Parliament of Finland (1929–30)
Members of the Parliament of Finland (1930–33)
Members of the Parliament of Finland (1933–36)
Members of the Parliament of Finland (1936–39)
Members of the Parliament of Finland (1939–45)
Members of the Parliament of Finland (1945–48)
Members of the Parliament of Finland (1948–51)
Members of the Parliament of Finland (1951–54)
Members of the Parliament of Finland (1954–58)
Members of the Parliament of Finland (1958–62)